All Parks Alliance for Change (APAC) is a nonprofit organization that focuses on Minnesota mobile homes and parks.

History 
APAC was founded in 1980 by a group of park residents in Anoka County who initially worked to eliminate no-cause evictions, and to create new storm shelter standards. These efforts eventually lead to the establishment of a special section of state law for manufactured home parks (Minnesota Statute 327C).

References

External links 
All Parks Alliance for Change
National Manufactured Home Owners Association

Non-profit organizations based in Minnesota